The Pakistani women's cricket team toured Ireland in between 23 July and 2 August 2000 to play against the Irish women's national cricket team in a 5 match WODI series and in a one-off Test match, which was also the first ever test appearance for Ireland women's cricket team and also marked the first ever test match to have held in Ireland. 

Originally, the ODI series between the two teams were initially scheduled to be held as a 3 match series but later both Pakistan and Ireland agreed to play in further two WODI matches after the solitary test finished only within a space of 2 days. Ireland won the WODI series 4-0 and the only test match. Irish women's cricket team managed to win the WODI series after winning the first three ODI matches (3-0) just prior to the start of the only test match, with Ireland winning the 4th One Day International on the next day (on 1 August 2000) after the conclusion of the test match which ended on 31 July 2000 and the fifth being abandoned due to rain.

The Irish team won the historical test match on its debut against Pakistan by an innings and 54 runs which was held in Dublin. This was also the only international test cricket match hosted by Ireland until 2018. 

18 years later after the first test appearance for the Ireland women's cricket team, their male counterparts, the Ireland men's national cricket team also made its test debut against Pakistan in 2018.

Isobel Joyce who made her Women's test debut in 2000 against Pakistan for Irish women's team along with Ed Joyce who made his test debut in 2018 for Irish men's team became only the second brother-sister siblings to have played in test cricket following Denise Emerson and Terry Alderman of Australia. Ed Joyce and Isobel Joyce are also the only brother-sister siblings combination to have made their Test debuts when playing for their respective gender teams on the country's first ever test appearances.

WODI series

1st WODI

2nd WODI

3rd WODI

4th WODI

5th WODI

Test series

Only Test

References

Further reading

 

2000 in women's cricket
Pakistan 2000
Ireland 2000
2000 in Irish cricket
2000 in Pakistani cricket
International cricket competitions in 2000
Cricket
July 2000 sports events in Europe
August 2000 sports events in Europe
2000 in Pakistani women's sport